A Nun at the Crossroads is a 1967 Italian film starring Rosanna Schiaffino and John Richardson and directed by Julio Buchs. The film was bought by Universal who released the film in 1971.

Plot
A nun is raped in the Belgian Congo and becomes pregnant.

References

External links
''A Nun at the Crossroads at IMDb

A Nun at the Crossroads at Letterbox DVD

Italian drama films
1967 films
1960s Italian films